Athey is an English-language toponymic surname. Notable people with the surname include:

 Bill Athey (born 1957), English cricketer
 Clay Athey (born 1960), American politician and jurist
 Edward L. Athey (1921–2010), sports coach and athletic director at Washington College.
 Ron Athey (born 1961), American performance artist
 Susan Athey (born 1970), American microeconomist
 Tyras S. Athey (1927–2010), American politician from Maryland

See also

References 

English toponymic surnames